The Bandersnatch is a fictional creature mentioned in Lewis Carroll's poem Jabberwocky.

Bandersnatch may also refer to:

Bandersnatch (video game), a computer game written by Imagine Software and later released as Brataccas
Bandersnatch (Known Space),  a sluglike sentient creature in Larry Niven's fictional Known Space universe
9780 Bandersnatch, an asteroid
Bandersnatch, a newspaper run by John Abbott College students
A Sasquatch infected with the HMHVV-II virus in the Shadowrun role-playing game
Frumious Bandersnatch, a seminal 1960s psychedelic rock band from San Francisco, California
Black Mirror: Bandersnatch, a television film of the anthology series Black Mirror